The Valenzuela City Polytechnic College, or simply referred to as Val Poly, is a technical college located in Parada, Valenzuela City, Philippines. It was founded in 1996 by Edison Nalo and is formerly called as Valenzuela Manpower.

Courses offered

Four-year courses
 Bachelor of Technical Teacher Education
Major in Computer Technology
Major in Electrical Education
Major in Mechanical Education
Major in Refrigeration and Air Conditioning Technology Education
Major in Electronics Education Science
Major in Food Service Management
Major in Civil Technology
Major in Garments Fashion Design
Major in Welding and Fabrication Technology
Major in Vulcanizing Technology

One-year courses
 Electrical Engineering Technology
 Electronics Engineering Technology
 Automotive Engineering Technology
 Refrigeration and Air Conditioning Engineering Technology

Six-month courses
 Apparel and Fashion Technology (AFT)
 Electronics Technology (ESET)
 Mechanical Technology (MET)
 Computer Technology (CT)

Universities and colleges in Metro Manila
Education in Valenzuela, Metro Manila
Educational institutions established in 1996
1996 establishments in the Philippines